Babbin is a surname. Notable people with the surname include:

Jacqueline Babbin (1926–2001), American television writer, producer, and executive
Jed Babbin (born 1950), American government official, author, and pundit

See also 
Babbin, the former German name for the village of Babin, Pyrzyce County, in western Poland
Habbin